Piotr Gryszkiewicz (born 17 June 2001) is a Polish footballer who currently plays for ŁKS Łódź as a midfielder.

Biography

Gryszkiewicz started playing football at an early age with Olivia Gdańsk. In 2010 he joined the Lechia Gdańsk academy for a season, before making a switch to join AP Lechia Gdańsk. After 5 years playing with the youth sides of ALPG Gryszkiewicz again returned to Lechia Gdańsk.

In 2018 Gryszkiewicz started playing with the Lechia Gdańsk II team in the IV liga, making 32 appearances over the course of two seasons, and started training with the first team in 2019. His contract was not renewed with Lechia, and during the summer of 2020 Gryszkiewicz joined I liga team ŁKS Łódź.

References

2001 births
Lechia Gdańsk II players
ŁKS Łódź players
Polish footballers
Association football midfielders
Living people